Cecil Andrew Plaxton was an  Anglican priest: the Archdeacon of Wiltshire from 1951  to 1974.

Born in 1902, he was educated at Magdalen College School, Oxford and St Edmund Hall, Oxford. After a period of study at Ripon College Cuddesdon he was ordained in 1927. Following a curacy at St Martin, Salisbury he held incumbencies at Devizes, Weymouth and Pewsey.

He died on 2 February 1993.

References

1902 births
People educated at Magdalen College School, Oxford
Alumni of St Edmund Hall, Oxford
Alumni of Ripon College Cuddesdon
Archdeacons of Wilts
1993 deaths